Tanya Georgieva (born June 12, 1970 in Novi Iskar) is a Bulgarian sprint canoer who competed in the early 1990s. She was eliminated in the semifinals of the K-4 500 m event at the 1992 Summer Olympics in Barcelona.

References
 Sports-Reference.com profile

1970 births
Bulgarian female canoeists
Canoeists at the 1992 Summer Olympics
Living people
Olympic canoeists of Bulgaria